Alexander Shankly was a Scottish professional footballer who played in the Scottish League for Ayr United and Nithsdale Wanderers as an inside left.

Personal life 
Shankly's brothers Bill, Jimmy, John and Bob all became footballers. He served in the Royal Scots Fusiliers and in the Royal Flying Corps during the First World War. Shankly was troubled by sciatica after the war and returned to work as a miner before being forced into early retirement.

Career statistics

References

Scottish footballers
Scottish Football League players
Year of birth missing
Place of death missing
Footballers from East Ayrshire
Association football inside forwards
Year of death missing
Glenbuck Cherrypickers F.C. players
Ayr United F.C. players
Nithsdale Wanderers F.C. players
Portsmouth F.C. players
British Army personnel of World War I
Royal Scots Fusiliers soldiers
Royal Flying Corps soldiers
Association football wing halves
Scottish miners